Hüseyin Erkmen (born 8 September 1915, date of death unknown) was a Turkish wrestler. He competed in the men's Greco-Roman bantamweight at the 1936 Summer Olympics.

References

External links
 

1915 births
Year of death missing
Turkish male sport wrestlers
Olympic wrestlers of Turkey
Wrestlers at the 1936 Summer Olympics
Place of birth missing
20th-century Turkish people